Stopping at Slowyear is a 1991 science fiction novel by American writer Frederik Pohl.

Plot summary

Stopping at Slowyear tells the story of an interstellar cargo vessel which runs between out-of-the-way worlds, as it visits a planet called Slowyear after its 19-year-long revolution around its star.

The crew explore the local culture and find several odd customs.  Among these is of a sort of death lottery as a punishment for crimes.  If someone commits a crime, they are sentenced to take a pill, which depending on the severity of the infraction will have a different probability of being lethal poison.

Slowyear's principal industry is raising sheep.  During their isolation, their sheep have developed a form of scrapie which is lethal to humans without immunity.

Stopping at Slowyear addressed prion diseases years before public awareness of mad cow disease was widespread.

External links
 

1991 American novels
1991 science fiction novels
American science fiction novels
Novels by Frederik Pohl